The International Garden Festival was a garden festival recognised by the International Association of Horticultural producers (AIPH) and the Bureau International des Expositions (BIE), which was held in Liverpool, England from 2 May to 14 October 1984. It was the first such event held in Britain, and became the model for several others held during the 1980s and early 1990s. The aim was to revitalise tourism and the city of Liverpool which had suffered cutbacks, and the idea came from Conservative Environment Minister Michael Heseltine.
The festival was hugely popular, attracting 3,380,000 visitors.

The festival
The international horticultural exposition was held on a  derelict industrial site south of Herculaneum Dock, near the Dingle and overlooking the River Mersey. On this site was built sixty individual gardens, including a Japanese garden and pagodas. A large exhibition space, the Festival Hall, formed the centrepiece of the site and housed numerous indoor exhibits.

Other attractions included a walk of fame, featuring numerous stars connected with Liverpool, and a light railway system (see below). Public artwork included the Yellow Submarine, a statue of John Lennon, a Blue Peter ship, the Wish You Were Here tourist sculpture, a red dragon slide, a large red bull sculpture and Kissing Gate (by Alain Ayers).

The Festival Railway
A  gauge minimum gauge railway system provided transport around the site. The light railway system consisted of a mainline providing transport links between a series of stations at key locations around the festival site, and a junction linking to a branch line. There were also extensive shed and workshop facilities. A considerable investment was made in the purchase of passenger coaches, and in the purchase and installation of permanent way. Additional passenger coaches (of the 20-seat 'teak' saloon type) were borrowed from the Romney, Hythe and Dymchurch Railway in Kent. The prohibitive cost of purchasing locomotives was avoided through the use of engines which were deemed 'spare' on other existing  gauge minimum gauge railways, particularly the United Kingdom's two most extensive railways of this gauge, the Romney, Hythe and Dymchurch Railway, and the Ravenglass and Eskdale Railway. The cost of building and hiring passenger coaches was partly offset through sponsorship by the National Westminster Bank, whose name and logo was painted on the side of every coach. The visiting locomotives, leased coaches, and purpose-built passenger carriages provided the mainline service, whilst the branch line was operated on a shuttle basis by a 1970s-built diesel multiple unit railcar set (named Silver Jubilee) on loan from the Ravenglass and Eskdale Railway.

The festival site

Since the festival closed, the site has passed through the hands of a series of developers. From the late 1980s until its closure in 1996, the Festival Hall was used as the Pleasure Island amusement park. Half of the site has since been turned into residential housing. The Festival Hall dome was demolished in late 2006.

In November 2006 local companies Langtree and McLean announced plans for the site that will see more than 1,000 new homes built around the cleared dome area, as well as the restoration of the original gardens created for the festival in 1984.

Liverpool Festival Gardens
In September 2009 it was announced that work would begin on redeveloping the site in November 2009, after the city council gave permission for work to begin. The redevelopment would see the Chinese and Japanese gardens being restored, as well as the lakes and associated watercourses and the woodland sculpture trails. Funding came from a range of sources, including the Northwest Regional Development Agency, who provided a £3.7million grant.
Redevelopment work began in February 2010

In 2012, Liverpool Festival Gardens finally reopened. The restored garden site had been due to re-open in September 2011, however, this was delayed until 2012 whilst a new landscape management contractor was found after the original contractor, Mayfield Construction, went into administration. The garden site is now managed by The Land Trust.

The new restored site features:
 Two restored pagodas in the oriental gardens
 The restored Moon Wall
 New lakes, waterways and waterfalls
 New pedestrian access point linking to the promenade
 New secure parking area

In 2022 work was completed on a smaller refurbished car park as part of a project to create a new southern grasslands extension to the Festival Gardens.

New housing
In March 2013, the developers Langtree began work on the 1300 planned homes on the site, despite the earlier collapse of partner David McLean Homes. In 2017 Liverpool City Council took back control of the site and in 2018 appointed Ion and partner Midia as the development partner with City Council. Remediation works at the site to remove waste from the landfill is due to completed in 2023.

References

Further reading

External links
 BBC Liverpool: 20 years since the festival showing the site in 1984 and 2004
 Campaign to restore the festival site
 Official website of the Bureau International des Expositions (BIE)
 Community website for the area
 Langtree Group's official page for the Festival Gardens site
 Liverpool Festival Gardens
 

National garden festivals
History of Liverpool
1984 in England
15 in gauge railways in England
International horticultural exhibitions
20th century in Liverpool
Flower festivals in the United Kingdom
Garden festivals in England
1984 festivals